Thyridolepis is a genus of Australian plants in the family Poaceae.

 Species
 Thyridolepis mitchelliana (Nees) S.T.Blake
 Thyridolepis multiculmis (Pilg.) S.T.Blake
 Thyridolepis xerophila (Domin) S.T.Blake

References

Panicoideae
Poaceae genera
Endemic flora of Australia